Arnold Pieter Bernard "Arno" den Hartog (born 8 November 1954 in Oss) is a former field hockey player from the Netherlands. He was a member of the Dutch National Team that finished sixth in the 1984 Summer Olympics in Los Angeles.

Between 1979-1985 Den Hartog earned a total number of 109 caps and scored seventeen goals. After his hockey career he worked for the Royal Dutch Field Hockey Federation.

External links
 
 Dutch Hockey Federation

1954 births
Living people
Dutch male field hockey players
Olympic field hockey players of the Netherlands
Field hockey players at the 1984 Summer Olympics
Sportspeople from Oss
SV Kampong players
20th-century Dutch people